Isidore Nibizi is a Burundian diplomat and is the current Ambassador of Burundi to Russia, presenting his credentials to Russian President Dmitry Medvedev on 16 December 2009.

References

Living people
Ambassadors of Burundi to Russia
Year of birth missing (living people)